Fairfield Township is one of twenty townships in Fayette County, Iowa, USA.  As of the 2010 census, its population was 652.

Geography
According to the United States Census Bureau, Fairfield Township covers an area of 36.3 square miles (94 square kilometers).

Cities, towns, villages
 Arlington

Unincorporated towns
 Taylorsville at 
(This list is based on USGS data and may include former settlements.)

Adjacent townships
 Illyria Township (north)
 Highland Township, Clayton County (northeast)
 Sperry Township, Clayton County (east)
 Cass Township, Clayton County (southeast)
 Putnam Township (south)
 Scott Township (southwest)
 Smithfield Township (west)
 Westfield Township (northwest)

Cemeteries
The township contains these three cemeteries: Arlington, Corn Hill and Taylorville.

Major highways
  Iowa Highway 187

Landmarks
 Brush Creek Canyon State Park

School districts
 North Fayette Valley Community School District
 Starmont Community School District

Political districts
 Iowa's 1st congressional district
 State House District 24
 State Senate District 12

References
 United States Census Bureau 2008 TIGER/Line Shapefiles
 United States Board on Geographic Names (GNIS)
 United States National Atlas

External links
 US-Counties.com
 City-Data.com

Townships in Fayette County, Iowa
Townships in Iowa